The Central Maine Medical Center is a hospital located at 300 Main Street in the city of Lewiston, Maine. It serves most of Androscoggin County, including Lewiston and Auburn, Maine and various small and medium-sized communities. It is designated as a trauma center. The hospital was established in the 1860s and officially incorporated in 1888 by Dr. Edward H. Hill, an alumnus of nearby Bates College and also Harvard Medical School. The hospital is currently a teaching affiliate of Boston University School of Medicine and University of New England College of Osteopathic Medicine.

Services
CMMC is located downtown at High Street near Bates College. The hospital campus includes several large parking facilities, a LifeFlight of Maine helipad. In recent years the hospital has created the Central Maine Heart and Vascular Institute, and the Patrick Dempsey Center for Cancer Hope & Healing. The hospital has approximately 250 beds, and approximately 300 physicians. Central Maine Medical Center is the flagship hospital of Central Maine Medical Family. The organization runs two other hospitals, one in Bridgton and another in Rumford. CMMC operates the Maine College of Health Professions and many affiliated long-term care facilities, clinics, and practices throughout central and western Maine. The current CEO of the hospital chain is Jeff Brickman. The Central Maine Medical Family is located a block away from the hospital on Bates Street in the Lowell Square Building, a refurbished textile factory. CMMC recently underwent major renovations to their emergency department.

See also
List of hospitals in Maine

References

External links
 http://www.cmmc.org/

Hospitals in Maine
Buildings and structures in Lewiston, Maine
Trauma centers
https://www.maineunitedhealth.com/get-a-quote